The Black Sheep of the Family is a 1916 American silent mystery film directed by Jay Hunt and starring Francelia Billington, Jack Holt, and Gilmore Hammond.

Cast
 Francelia Billington as Esther Saunders 
 Jack Holt as Kenneth Carmont 
 Gilmore Hammond as Elwood Collins 
 Paul Byron as Bert Saunders 
 Mina Cunard as Bertha Carmont 
 C. Norman Hammond as Madison Carmont 
 Florence Hale as Mrs. Carmont
 Hector V. Sarno as Simon Hathaway 
 William Musgrave as Louis Dairymple

References

Bibliography
 Ken Wlaschin. Silent Mystery and Detective Movies: A Comprehensive Filmography. McFarland, 2009.

External links
 

1916 films
1916 mystery films
American silent feature films
American mystery films
Films directed by Jay Hunt
American black-and-white films
Universal Pictures films
1910s English-language films
1910s American films
Silent mystery films